Boltiere is a comune (municipality) in the Province of Bergamo in the Italian region of Lombardy, located about  northeast of Milan and about  southwest of Bergamo.

Boltiere borders the following municipalities: Brembate, Ciserano, Osio Sotto, Pontirolo Nuovo, Verdellino.

Demographic evolution

References